K-103 is a  east–west state highway located entirely in Cherokee County in the U.S. state of Kansas. K-103's western terminus is at K-7 south of the City of Cherokee and the eastern terminus is at U.S. Route 69 (US-69), US-160 and US-400 south of the City of Pittsburg. Along the way the route passes through the City of Weir.

K-103 was designated as a state highway by 1936, and extended from US-160 east to US-69. Then in 1958, US-160 was realigned east along K-103 from K-103's original western terminus to K-7 then continued east along K-104 to US-69, and at that time K-103 was truncated to its current western terminus.

Route description
K-103 begins at an at-grade intersection with K-7 south of Cherokee and begins travelling east. After roughly  it crosses BNSF Railway tracks. It then passes the Hosey Hill Cemetery then reaches Weir. It travels  through the city and continues east. After roughly  it crosses Brush Creek, a tributary of Cow Creek and then reaches its eastern terminus at US-69, US-160 and US-400.

K-103 is not included in the National Highway System. The National Highway System is a system of highways important to the nation's defense, economy, and mobility. K-103 does connect to the National Highway System at its eastern terminus. 2017 Annual average daily traffic (AADT) on K-103 was 775 near the eastern terminus. The entire route is paved with partial design bituminous pavement.

History

Early roads 
Before state highways were numbered in Kansas there were Auto trails, which were an informal network of marked routes that existed in the United States and Canada in the early part of the 20th century. K-103's western terminus (K-7) was part of the Jefferson Highway and Kansas City-Fort Scott-Miami-Tulsa Short Line auto trails.

Establishment and realignments 
In a September 17, 1942 meeting, it was approved to realign K-103 as a spur from Weir northward to a new alignment of US-160. But then in a September 30, 1943 resolution, that plan was cancelled due to restrictions imposed on the State Highway Commission caused by World War II. Then in 1958, US-160 was realigned east along K-103 from K-103's original western terminus to K-7 then continued east along K-104 to US-69, and at that time K-103 was truncated to its current western terminus.

Major intersections

References

External links

Kansas Department of Transportation State Map
KDOT: Historic State Maps

103
Transportation in Cherokee County, Kansas